Yenda is a rural locality in the North Burnett Region, Queensland, Australia.

Geography 
The Burnett River forms the south-western boundary of the locality.

History 
The locality takes its name from a pastoral run taken up by Robert Wilkin. It is believed to be an Aboriginal word meaning swamp.

Education 
There are no schools in Yenda. The nearest primary schools are in Mount Perry, Binjour and Gayndah. The nearest secondary school is in Gayndah.

References 

North Burnett Region

Localities in Queensland